Eddie Haverty is an Irish politician who was Mayor of County Galway.

A native of Killimor, Haverty was succeeded in 2011 by fellow-Killimor man, Jimmy McClearn.

External links
 

Politicians from County Galway
Fine Gael politicians
Year of birth missing (living people)
Living people
21st-century Irish politicians